The Journal of Emergencies, Trauma, and Shock is a peer-reviewed open access medical journal published by Medknow Publications on behalf of the INDO-US Emergency and Trauma Collaborative. it covers all aspects of emergency medicine, emergency surgery, pre-hospital care, trauma, and shock. The journal was established in 2008 and the editors-in-chief are Kelly P O’Keefe (University of South Florida), Praveen Aggarwal (All India Institute of Medical Sciences), Tracy Sanson (University of South Florida), and L.R. Murmu (All India Institute of Medical Sciences).

The journal is abstracted and indexed in Abstracts on Hygiene and Communicable Diseases, EBSCO databases, EmCare, Expanded Academic ASAP, Global Health, ProQuest, PubMed Central, SafetyLit, and Scopus.

External links 
 
 INDO-US Emergency & Trauma Collaborative

Open access journals
Quarterly journals
English-language journals
Emergency medicine journals
Medknow Publications academic journals
Publications established in 2008